This is a list of Middle-earth video games. It includes both video games based directly on J. R. R. Tolkien's books about Middle-earth, and those derived from books, films, and television series which in turn were based on Tolkien's works. Note that some titles advertised as ports for the most disparate platforms were in fact greatly or completely different games, organized as separate projects, or by independent studios.

Official games based on the novels

 2D Era (1982–1994)

 3D Era (2002–present)

Official games based on the films

Mobile games

Browser and flash games

Cancelled games and ports

Parodies
 Bored of the Rings (1985), partially inspired by the book of the same name (1969).
 The Boggit: Bored Too (1986)

References

Lists of video games based on works
Middle-earth lists